In mathematics, the Iwasawa decomposition (aka KAN from its expression) of a semisimple Lie group generalises the way a square real matrix can be written as a product of an orthogonal matrix and an upper triangular matrix (QR decomposition, a consequence of Gram–Schmidt orthogonalization). It is named after Kenkichi Iwasawa, the Japanese mathematician who developed this method.

Definition
G is a connected semisimple real Lie group.
 is the Lie algebra of G
θ is a Cartan involution of 
 is the corresponding Cartan decomposition
 is a maximal abelian subalgebra of 
Σ+ is a choice of positive roots of Σ
 is a nilpotent Lie algebra given as the  sum of the root spaces of Σ+

and the Iwasawa decomposition of G is

meaning there is an analytic diffeomorphism (but not a group homomorphism) from the manifold  to the Lie group , sending .

The dimension of A (or equivalently of ) is equal to the real rank of G.

Iwasawa decompositions also hold for some disconnected semisimple groups G, where K becomes a (disconnected) maximal compact subgroup provided the center of G is finite.

The restricted root space decomposition is

The number

Examples
If G=SLn(R), then we can take K to be the orthogonal matrices, A to be the positive diagonal matrices with determinant 1, and N to be the unipotent group consisting of upper triangular matrices with 1s on the diagonal.

For the case of n=2, the Iwasawa decomposition of G=SL(2,R) is in terms of

For the symplectic group G=Sp(2n, R ), a possible Iwasawa decomposition is in terms of

Non-Archimedean Iwasawa decomposition

See also
 Lie group decompositions
 Root system of a semi-simple Lie algebra

References

Lie groups